"Love Me like You Do" is a song recorded by English singer Ellie Goulding for the soundtrack to the film Fifty Shades of Grey (2015). The song was written by Savan Kotecha, Ilya Salmanzadeh, Tove Lo, Max Martin and Ali Payami; the latter two also produced it. Goulding was selected to provide vocals to the track. It was released on 7 January 2015 as the second single from the soundtrack. The song was also included on Goulding's third studio album, Delirium (2015).

"Love Me like You Do" is a mid-tempo electropop power ballad, with instrumentation consisting of massive synths and crushing drums. Lyrically, similar to the film's theme, the song talks about the uncontrollable feeling of falling in love and being seduced by someone whose touch leaves her begging for more, even when it hurts. It received acclaim from music critics, who praised Goulding's soft vocals and the song for being sultry and grandiose. The song earned Goulding her first Grammy Award nomination for Best Pop Solo Performance, while the songwriters were nominated for the Grammy Award for Best Song Written for Visual Media, the Golden Globe Award for Best Original Song, and the Broadcast Film Critics Association Award for Best Song.

"Love Me like You Do" topped the UK Singles Chart, a position it maintained for four weeks and held the record for the most-streamed track in a single week in the United Kingdom at the time. Outside the United Kingdom, "Love Me like You Do" became Goulding's most successful single as well as becoming her first chart-topper in various countries, going number one in over 30 official charts worldwide, including Australia, Austria, Bulgaria, the Czech Republic, Denmark, Finland, Germany, Greece, Hungary, Italy, Luxembourg, New Zealand, Norway, Poland, Portugal, the Republic of Ireland, Slovakia, Slovenia, Spain, Sweden and Switzerland and peaking within the top ten of the charts in various countries, including Belgium, Colombia and the United States. Its accompanying music video, which features scenes of the film and Goulding dancing with her partner in a ballroom, became the 21st video to receive one billion views on YouTube and received a nomination at the 2015 MTV Video Music Awards for Best Female Video.

Background
While seeking material for the Fifty Shades of Grey soundtrack, Republic Records contacted various artists, managers and music publishers to create a compilation that would appropriately represent the film's tone. "Love Me like You Do" was the result of Republic executive Tom Mackay contacting Max Martin's manager about writing a song for the film. Ilya started writing the chorus, while Ali Payami and Martin came next, with Martin "tweaking" the song and Savan Kotecha and Tove Lo also contributing with lyrics. According to Kotecha, "Love Me like You Do" was already being developed by both him and Martin prior to Fifty Shades of Grey, and he had considered giving the song to American singer Demi Lovato. However, after being shown a scene from the film during a meeting for the film's soundtrack, Martin thought "Love Me like You Do" could work, and began reworking the song for inclusion. After that, the film director Sam Taylor-Johnson asked Ellie Goulding to sing the song. Goulding, who previously contributed songs to the soundtracks to The Twilight Saga: Breaking Dawn – Part 2, The Hunger Games: Catching Fire and Divergent, initially thought about declining the invitation to record another song for a soundtrack to focus on her then-upcoming third studio album. However, after meeting the film crew and hearing the ballad she accepted. She commented:
"I wasn't going to get involved in that soundtrack because I've done a lot of soundtracks and we kind of thought we've done a bit too much film stuff. So we should probably just chill and write that third album, which is what I should be focusing on. And then I met the director [Sam Taylor-Johnson] and everyone involved and I was like, 'This is a pretty cool thing to be involved in.' Then I heard the song and I was like, 'Woah, this is a pretty awesome song.' I didn't know that it was going to be this big, genuinely. I thought [maybe] it would do well."

A slightly reworked version of the song was included on the soundtrack to the 2018 film Fifty Shades Freed, the third and final installment in the series.

Composition and lyrics
"Love Me like You Do" was written by Max Martin, Savan Kotecha, Ilya Salmanzadeh, Ali Payami and Tove Lo, with production by Martin and Payami; they were also responsible for programming, drums, percussion, keys and bass. Strings were arranged by Mattias Bylund, violin was played by Mattias Johansson and cello by David Bukovinsky. Peter Carlsson was responsible for vocal editing, as well as background vocals, along with Martin, Payami, Ilya, Kotecha, Oscar Holter, Robin Fredriksson, Mattias Larsson, Oscar Görres and Ludvig Söderberg. It was recorded in Los Angeles and Stockholm. According to the sheet music published at MusicNotes.com by Kobalt Music Group, the song is written in the key of A major, with a moderate tempo of 95 beats per minute. Goulding's vocal range spans from the low note of Ab3 to the high note of Eb5.

"Love Me like You Do" is a tender electropop power ballad, with a "synth-filled, '80s-sounding" production. Its instrumentation consists of massive synthesisers and crushing drums, while Goulding delivers a "soft, understated vocals". In the opening seconds she sings, "You're the cure/ you're the pain/ you're the only thing I want to touch/ Never knew that it/ could mean so much/ You're the fear/ I don't care/ 'Cause I've never been so high." Lyrically, "Love Me like You Do" contrasts "innocent romantic longing" and "brooding, addictive, pain-laced sensuality", which according to Plugged In's Adam R. Holz, "mirrors the story arc of Anastasia Steele and Christian Grey" in both the book and the film. He went on to explain its lyrical content: "[It] tells the tale of a woman entranced and seduced by someone whose touch leaves her begging for more, even when—or perhaps especially when—it hurts."

Critical reception
"Love Me like You Do" was acclaimed by music critics. Samantha Grossman of Time called the song "sultry" and dubbed it a "solid addition to the Fifty Shades soundtrack." Christina Garibaldi of MTV News also called it "sultry" and "soft", adding that "we can totally picture it being played during any steamy scene." Ryan Reed of Rolling Stone opined that its "results are grandiose, considering the film's sensual subject matter." Jim Farber of the New York Daily News praised her "little-girl-lost voice", noting that "Goulding sounds sweet even when she's courting danger. The music, likewise, goes for a high gloss take on romance, recalling the heavily echoed beats and dense synthesizers of a Phil Collins ballad from the '80s." Robbie Daw of Idolator described "Love Me like You Do" as "a sweeping power ballad that finds Goulding delivering soft, understated vocals over producer Max Martin's swelling bed of synths." Lucas Villa of AXS commended Goulding for "masterfully tread[ing] between delicacy and power in her performance", calling the song "intimately magnificent". Glenn Gamboa of Newsday called it "sweet, catchy, near-perfect rom-com fare".

Carolyn Menyes of Music Times complimented the song for being "sweet and dreamy, like the majority of Goulding's discography", also observing that "[t]he crawling pace works well as Goulding rolls her way through the melody, all at once being enchanting and loving. Her breathy vocals, as always, complete the atmospheric sensibility of the track." While reviewing the Fifty Shades of Grey soundtrack, Dave Holmes wrote for Esquire that the song was "[t]he closest thing to a single we've heard so far", adding that the song has "a touch of longing, a little bit of a beat" and "Goulding's voice is the sound of heavy petting." Mikael Wood, writing for Los Angeles Times, said that Goulding "put across a tender sensuality [...] even as super-producer Max Martin jacks the stadium-rave beat." Stephen Thomas Erlewine of AllMusic, in his soundtrack analysis, wrote that "it moves into the area of background romantic music, a vibe that's sometimes pierced by those overly familiar oldies that surely play a bigger role onscreen than they do on album." In a less favourable review, Jason Lipshutz of Billboard gave the song two and a half stars out of five, complimenting Goulding's voice as "one of pop's more distinct voices" and the tune's "colossal chorus", but panning its "clichéd lyrics".

Accolades
"Love Me like You Do" was first nominated for a 2015 Teen Choice Award in the category "Song from a Movie or TV Show", but eventually lost to Furious 7 "See You Again", performed by Wiz Khalifa and Charlie Puth. It was also nominated for a 2015 MTV Europe Music Award for Best Song, but lost to Taylor Swift's "Bad Blood". At the 2015 BBC Music Awards, the song was nominated for "Song of the Year", losing to Hozier's "Take Me to Church". It won the award for Best International Song at the 2015 Los Premios 40 Principales. The song was also nominated for "Favorite Song of the Year" at the 42nd People's Choice Awards, losing to Justin Bieber's "What Do You Mean?. It also received two nominations at the 58th Annual Grammy Awards: Best Pop Solo Performance (lost to Ed Sheeran's "Thinking Out Loud") and Best Song Written for Visual Media (losing to Selma "Glory", performed by Common and John Legend), becoming the first time Goulding was nominated. The song also received a Golden Globe nomination in its 73rd edition on the Best Original Song category, but lost to Spectre's "Writing's on the Wall", performed by Sam Smith.

Commercial performance
"Love Me like You Do" entered at the top of the UK Singles Chart with first-week sales of 172,368 units, becoming Goulding's second number one on the chart after "Burn" (2013). The single remained at number one for a second week with chart sales of 118,225 copies and 2.25 million streams, and then a third consecutive week selling a further 118,000 copies. In its third week at number one, "Love Me like You Do" broke the streaming record in the United Kingdom at the time, with 2.58 million streams over seven days, surpassing Mark Ronson's "Uptown Funk" previous record. At the same time, the song was streamed almost 15.5 million times globally. It spent a total of four weeks at the top of the UK Singles Chart, becoming her longest number-one single on the listing.

Elsewhere in Europe, "Love Me like You Do" topped the charts in Austria, Bulgaria, the Czech Republic, Denmark, Finland, Germany, Greece, Hungary, Ireland, Italy, Luxembourg, Norway, Poland, Portugal, Slovakia, Slovenia, Spain, Sweden and Switzerland. In France, the song peaked at number five, Goulding's highest-charting single and second top-10 single on the French Singles Chart. In the Netherlands, the song became her first solo single to reach the top 10, peaking at number two on the Dutch Top 40.

In the United States, "Love Me like You Do" debuted at number 45 on the Billboard Hot 100 chart dated 24 January 2015, with first-week sales of 79,000 copies. The following week, the song climbed to number 36, and then to number 20 in its third week. On the issue dated 14 February 2015, it rose to number 14. "Love Me like You Do" reached number nine the following week, becoming Goulding's second top-10 entry on the chart. In its seventh week, the song peaked at number three on the Billboard Hot 100, becoming her highest-charting single since "Lights" peaked at number two on the chart in July 2012. On the Pop Songs chart, it was her second single to top the charts, and on the Adult Top 40 chart, it was her first number-one. "Love Me like You Do" debuted at number 38 on the Canadian Hot 100 for the week ending 24 January 2015, later peaking at number three.

In Australasia, track entered at number eight on the Australian Singles Chart and at number three on the New Zealand Singles Chart. In its fourth week, "Love Me like You Do" reached number one on both charts, becoming Goulding's first number-one single in both countries.

Music video
The music video for "Love Me like You Do" was directed by Georgia Hudson and premiered on 22 January 2015. It stars Goulding and her on-screen partner ballroom dancing in a mansion, as well as scenes from Fifty Shades of Grey. Regarding the dance in the video, she commented: "I am in it. That's me! I'm dancing in it!. [...] I basically have become fascinated with ballroom dancing so I was like, 'Can I please do some dancing in it?'. So they let me do that. There's a guy in it, Charlie, and there's some really sensual moments in it, and it's in a really beautiful house. I think it's one of my favorite videos." The video received a nomination for Best Female Video at the 2015 MTV Video Music Awards. With over 2.1 billion views, the video is one of the 50 most viewed YouTube videos of all time; it surpassed one billion views on 29 February 2016, becoming the 21st video in the site's history to do so.

Live performances and cover versions
Goulding performed "Love Me like You Do" in March 2015 at a Nike app launch. On 17 October 2015, Goulding was invited by Taylor Swift on her 1989 Tour as a surprise guest to sing a duet with her. On 25 October 2015, Goulding delivered a performance at the 2015 MTV Europe Music Awards, which Billboard called "sexy" and "straightforward". On 7 November 2015, she sang it at the NRJ Music Awards. In the same month, she was also part of the American Express Unstaged, directed by Scarlett Johansson. On 20 November 2015, Goulding's performance at Idol Sweden included the song. On 24 November 2015, she and James Corden sang it in several genres during The Late Late Show with James Corden, including rock, hip hop, country, rave, reggae, folk, and gospel. Goulding performed it during Victoria's Secret Fashion Show, which aired on 8 December 2015. On 6 December 2015, she appeared at Capital FM's Jingle Bell Ball. On 10 December 2015, she gave another rendition of the song at the 2015 BBC Music Awards with the BBC Concert Orchestra. On 18 April 2020, Goulding performed the song's accoutic version at One World: Together at Home.

In March 2015, Circa Waves performed a rock cover at BBC Radio 1's Live Lounge. That same month, James Arthur covered the song for MTV. In May 2015, Ella Henderson delivered an acoustic cover at Spin 1038 Live Room. In September 2015, Rhodes covered the song at BBC Radio 1's Live Lounge.

The song appears in the 2019 Max Martin jukebox musical & Juliet where it is performed by Romeo. Jordan Luke Gage, who originated the role on the West End, recorded the song for the official cast soundtrack.

Track listings

Credits and personnel
Credits adapted from the liner notes of Fifty Shades of Grey: Original Motion Picture Soundtrack.

Recording
 Recorded at MXM Studios (Los Angeles, California, and Stockholm, Sweden) and Wolf Cousins Studios (Stockholm, Sweden)
 Strings recorded at The RedRoom (Gothenburg, Sweden)
 Mixed at MixStar Studios (Virginia Beach, Virginia)
 Mastered at Bernie Grundman Mastering (Hollywood, California)

Personnel

 Ellie Goulding – lead vocals
 Max Martin – production, programming, drums, percussion, keys, bass, backing vocals
 Ali Payami – production, programming, drums, percussion, keys, bass, backing vocals
 Serban Ghenea – mixing
 John Hanes – engineering for mix
 Sam Holland – engineering
 Peter Carlsson – vocal editing, backing vocals
 Brian Gardner – mastering
 Mattias Bylund – strings, string arrangement, string recording, string editing
 Mattias Johansson – violin
 David Bukovinszky – cello
 Ilya – backing vocals
 Savan Kotecha – backing vocals
 Oscar Holter – backing vocals
 Robin Fredriksson – backing vocals
 Mattias Larsson – backing vocals
 Oscar Görres – backing vocals
 Ludvig Söderberg – backing vocals

Charts

Weekly charts

Year-end charts

Decade-end charts

Certifications

Release history

References

External links
 

2010s ballads
2014 songs
2015 songs
2015 singles
Cherrytree Records singles
Electropop ballads
Ellie Goulding songs
Fifty Shades film music
Interscope Records singles
Irish Singles Chart number-one singles
Number-one singles in Australia
Number-one singles in Austria
Number-one singles in Denmark
Number-one singles in Germany
Number-one singles in Greece
Number-one singles in Hungary
Number-one singles in Israel
Number-one singles in New Zealand
Number-one singles in Norway
Number-one singles in Poland
Number-one singles in Scotland
Number-one singles in Sweden
Number-one singles in Switzerland
Polydor Records singles
Pop ballads
Republic Records singles
Song recordings produced by Max Martin
Songs written for films
Songs written by Ali Payami
Songs written by Ilya Salmanzadeh
Songs written by Max Martin
Songs written by Savan Kotecha
Songs written by Tove Lo
South African Airplay Chart number-one singles
UK Singles Chart number-one singles